Carl Deurell (10 August 1868 – 9 December 1962) was a Swedish stage and film actor.

Selected filmography

 Andersson, Pettersson och Lundström (1923)
 The Saga of Gosta Berling (1924)
 The Tales of Ensign Stål (1926)
 Tired Theodore (1931)
 A Night of Love by the Öresund (1931)
 The Österman Brothers' Virago (1932)
 Lucky Devils (1932)
 People of Hälsingland (1933)
 Simon of Backabo (1934)
 Walpurgis Night (1935)
 The Marriage Game (1935)
 Walpurgis Night (1935)
 The Girls of Uppakra (1936)
 Johan Ulfstjerna (1936)
 Conflict (1937)
 John Ericsson, Victor of Hampton Roads (1937)
 Her Little Majesty (1939)
 Wanted (1939)
 With Open Arms (1940)
 Life Goes On (1941)
 The Fight Continues (1941)
 Bright Prospects (1941)
 Sun Over Klara (1942)
 A Girl for Me (1943)
 She Thought It Was Him (1943)
 Little Napoleon (1943)
 Katrina (1943)
 The Emperor of Portugallia (1944)
 I Am Fire and Air (1944)
 Man's Woman (1945)
 The Happy Tailor (1945)
 Barnen från Frostmofjället (1945)
 The Journey Away (1945)
 The Serious Game (1945)
 Desire (1946)
 Kristin Commands (1946)
 Åsa-Hanna (1946)
 Maria (1947)
 Rail Workers (1947)
 Girl from the Mountain Village (1948)
 On These Shoulders (1948)
 Private Bom (1948)
 Two Stories Up (1950)
 Tarps Elin (1956)

References

Bibliography
 Fromell, Axel. Stora Teatern i Göteborg 1893-1929: Nägra blad ur dess historia. A. Lindgren, 1929.
 Steene, Birgitta. Ingmar Bergman: A Guide to References and Resources. Amsterdam University Press, 2005. G.K. Hall, 1987

External links

1868 births
1962 deaths
Swedish male film actors
Swedish male silent film actors
Swedish male stage actors
20th-century Swedish male actors
Male actors from  Stockholm